Deh-e Azad may refer to:
 Deh-e Azad, Hirmand
 Deh-e Azad, Zehak